The 1979 AIAW Women's College World Series (WCWS) was held in Omaha, Nebraska on May 24–27. Sixteen fastpitch softball teams emerged from regional tournaments to meet in the national collegiate softball championship.

Teams
The double-elimination tournament included these teams:

 Arizona
 Arizona State
 Cal Poly–Pomona
 Chapman College (California)
 Emporia State (Kansas)
 Indiana
 Kansas
 Nebraska–Omaha
 Northern Colorado
 Oregon State
 Rutgers (New Jersey)
 South Carolina
 Texas A&M
 Texas Woman's
 UCLA
 Western Illinois

Texas Woman's University, newly named the Pioneers in February after years as the Tessies, won its first national championship behind the pitching of Kathy Arendsen, emerging from the losers' bracket to defeat defending champion UCLA with a pair of 1–0 wins in the final. On the final day, Arendsen pitched all 21 innings in three games. UCLA pitchers had posted shutouts in all of its games until the finals, a streak of nine games over two WCWS.

Bracket

Source:

Ranking

See also

References

Women's College World Series
Soft
Women's College World Series
Women's College World Series
Women's College World Series
Women's sports in Nebraska